Way Up There is an album by American jazz trumpeter, composer and arranger Shorty Rogers, released on the Atlantic label in 1957.

Reception

Jim Todd on Allmusic calls the album "a good overview of Rogers' work in the company of a who's who of West Coast jazz, playing arrangements for trumpet section and rhythm, quintet, and brass and winds with rhythm."

Track listing 
All compositions by Shorty Rogers except where noted.
 "Blues Way Up There" - 5:21
 "Moten Swing" (Benny Moten, Buster Moten) - 5:59
 "Blues Way Down There" - 4:15
 "Solarization" - 4:26
 "Pixieland" - 4:26
 "Wail of Two Cities" - 5:46
 "Baklava Bridge" - 5:27
 "March of the Martians" - 4:33  
Recorded in Los Angeles, CA on  March 3 (track 4), October 26 (track 8), December 6 (track 5), December 9 (tracks 6 & 7) and December 16 (tracks 1-3), 1955

Personnel 
Shorty Rogers - trumpet, flugelhorn
Conte Candoli, Pete Candoli, Harry Edison, Don Fagerquist - trumpet (track 5)
Bob Enevoldsen - valve trombone (tracks 6 & 7)
John Graas - French horn (tracks 6 & 7)
Paul Sarmento - tuba (tracks 6 & 7)
Jimmy Giuffre - clarinet (tracks 4 & 8)
Bud Shank - alto saxophone (tracks 1-3, 6 & 7)
Barney Kessel - guitar (tracks 1-3)
Pete Jolly (tracks 1-4), Lou Levy (tracks 5-8) - piano
Curtis Counce (track 4), Ralph Peña (tracks 5-8), Leroy Vinnegar (tracks 1-3) - bass 
Shelly Manne - drums

References 

Shorty Rogers albums
1957 albums
Atlantic Records albums
Albums produced by Nesuhi Ertegun
Albums arranged by Shorty Rogers